Irdning-Donnersbachtal is a new municipality since January 2015 with 4,137 residents (as of 1 January 2019) in the Liezen District of Styria, Austria.

The municipality was founded as part of the Styria municipal structural reform,
on 31 December 2014, from the dissolved independent municipalities Irdning, Donnersbach und Donnersbachwald.

Geography

Municipality arrangement 
The municipal territory includes the following 15 sections (populations as of 1 January 2015):

 Altirdning (484)
 Bleiberg (112)
 Donnersbach (284)
 Donnersbachwald (311)
 Erlsberg (346)
 Falkenburg (1028)
 Fuchsberg (20)
 Furrach (53)
 Ilgenberg (129)
 Irdning (793)
 Kienach (100)
 Planneralm (23)
 Raumberg (262)
 Ritzenberg (41)
 Winklern (144)

The municipality consists of six Katastralgemeinden: Altirdning, Donnersbach, Donnersbachwald, Erlsberg, Irdning, Raumberg.

Tourism 
The municipality formed, together with 
Aigen im Ennstal and Wörschach, the tourism agency "Grimming-Donnersbachtal". The base is the town Irdning-Donnersbachtal.

Culture and sights

References

External links 

 Gemeindedaten, Landesstatistik.Steiermark.at
 

Cities and towns in Liezen District